The Circle of Life is the fourth full-length album by the German power metal band Freedom Call. It was released on 21 May 2005 by SPV.

Track listing

Personnel
Chris Bay – vocals, guitar, keyboards
Cédric Dupont – guitar
Ilker Ersin – bass guitar
Nils Neumann – keyboards
Dan Zimmermann – drums

References 

2005 albums
Freedom Call albums
SPV/Steamhammer albums